"Should've Been Me" is a song by British record producer Naughty Boy featuring vocals from Kyla and Popcaan. It was released as a digital download in the United Kingdom on 18 November 2016. The song has peaked at number 61 on the UK Singles Chart. The artists co-wrote the song with James Murray, Mustafa Omer, Emily Warren, and Scott Harris.

Music video
A music video to accompany the release of "Should've Been Me" was first released onto YouTube on 1 December 2016 at a total length of four minutes and thirty seconds.

Track listing

Chart performance

Weekly charts

Year-end charts

Certifications

Release history

References

2016 songs
2016 singles
Naughty Boy songs
Kyla (British singer) songs
Songs written by Naughty Boy
Songs written by Mustafa Omer
Songs written by Emily Warren